Soft Shell Man is a Québécois film, directed by André Turpin released in 2001.

The film was shot September to October 2000 in Aylmer, Quebec and Montreal.

Synopsis 
Alex, a young photographer, continually seduces. He pleases everyone, without ever having any of his own ideas, passions, or conflicts. His existence is completely empty, dependent on the need to please others. While in Montreal, he has an adventure with a journalist, Marie, who is in the company of his best friend. This friend, Sara, is deaf.

Cast

Accolades
Soft Shell Man was Canada's submission for the Academy Award for Best Foreign Language Film, but was not nominated.

See also

 List of submissions to the 75th Academy Awards for Best Foreign Language Film
 List of Canadian submissions for the Academy Award for Best Foreign Language Film

References

External links 
 

Canadian drama films
Quebec films
2001 films
Films set in Montreal
Films shot in Montreal
2001 drama films
Best Film Prix Iris winners
2000s French-language films
French-language Canadian films
2000s Canadian films